Pancrazio Paolo Faragò (born 12 February 1993) is an Italian professional footballer who plays for  club Como.

Biography

Novara
Born in Catanzaro, in the Calabria region, Faragò was a player of the reserve team of Piedmontese club Novara during the 2011–12 season. Faragò made his Serie B debut during the 2012–13 Serie B season. He followed the club from their relegation to Lega Pro in 2014 and their promotion back to Serie B in 2015. In the 2015–16 Serie B season, Faragò wore the number 8 shirt.

Cagliari
On 19 January 2017, Faragò was signed by Cagliari in a temporary deal, with an obligation to sign him outright.

Loan to Bologna
On 29 January 2021, Faragò moved to Serie A club Bologna on a loan deal until the end of the season. The loan includes an option to buy.

Loan to Lecce
On 9 January 2022, he joined Lecce on loan until the end of the season with an option to buy. The option would have become an obligation to buy if certain performance conditions were met.

Como
On 27 August 2022, Faragò signed a two-year deal with Como.

Career statistics

Club

References

External links
 AIC profile (data by football.it) 

Living people
1993 births
People from Catanzaro
Footballers from Calabria
Association football midfielders
Italian footballers
Italy youth international footballers
Novara F.C. players
Cagliari Calcio players
Bologna F.C. 1909 players
U.S. Lecce players
Como 1907 players
Serie A players
Serie B players
Serie C players
Sportspeople from the Province of Catanzaro